Egidio Mguizami (born 26 April 1994) is an Angolan Italian  professional footballer who plays as a striker.

Career
Born in Rio de Janeiro, Brazil, he moved to Italy as a child and later joined Portogruaro, being initially assigned to the reserve team in the campionato berretti.

On 4 March 2012 Egidio made his Lega Pro debut, coming on as a late substitute in a 0–4 home loss against U.S. Cremonese.

References

External links

1994 births
Living people
Angolan footballers
Association football forwards
A.S.D. Portogruaro players